Dénes Friedmann (1903–1944) was a Hungarian writer and Chief Rabbi in Újpest (today part of Budapest), Hungary.

He was co-editor of Magyar Zsidó Szemle.

The Nazis killed Friedmann's son in his presence after which he was deported to the Auschwitz concentration camp where he was killed.

References

1903 births
1944 deaths
Hungarian Jews who died in the Holocaust
Hungarian people who died in Auschwitz concentration camp
People from Újpest
Hungarian civilians killed in World War II
Jewish Hungarian writers